Simon Best (born 11 February 1978) is a former Irish rugby union rugby player. He played for Ulster and was club captain in Ulster's 2005/06 Celtic League winning season. Simon missed the final game of Ulster' successful campaign in 2005/06 due to a broken ankle sustained while playing against Llanelli Scarlets in the penultimate game of the season.

Simon is the brother of the former Ireland and Ulster hooker Rory Best. He was educated at Portadown College and has also represented Ireland at schools, U19, U21, U25 and A levels. He later studied Agriculture at Newcastle University.

On 26 September 2007 Best was rushed to hospital in Bordeaux with a loss of feeling down his side. He was immediately pulled out of the Ireland World Cup side and returned home. On 25 February 2008, Best announced his retirement from rugby due to an irregular heartbeat. He stated he would no longer be able to sustain the high level of training that playing professional rugby required.

References

External links
Ulster profile
Ireland profile
Profile on itsrugby.co.uk
Irish prop Best forced to retire

1978 births
Living people
Irish rugby union players
Ireland international rugby union players
Ulster Rugby players
Belfast Harlequins rugby union players
Rugby union props
Alumni of Newcastle University
Rugby union players from County Armagh
People from Craigavon, County Armagh
People educated at Portadown College
Ireland Wolfhounds international rugby union players